Naked is the eighth and final studio album by American rock band Talking Heads, released on March 15, 1988, by Sire Records. Following the more straightforward new wave and pop rock sound on Little Creatures and True Stories, Naked marked a return to the worldbeat stylings of both Remain in Light and Speaking in Tongues, blending elements of Afrobeat, Latin funk, and art pop. The album's songs were formed from improvisational jam sessions recorded in Paris, which featured the participation of numerous guest musicians such as former Smiths guitarist Johnny Marr and singer Kirsty MacColl. Lyrics and vocals were then added in New York City following the Paris recordings.

Naked was positively received by critics, who viewed it as a return to form for the band following the mixed responses to True Stories; retrospective assessments, however, have been more lukewarm. The album was also a moderate commercial success, peaking at No. 19 on the US Billboard 200 and No. 3 on the UK Albums Chart, later being certified gold by both the RIAA and BPI. Following the album's release, Talking Heads officially went on hiatus, with its members focusing on various side-projects over the course of the next few years; frontman David Byrne would eventually announce in December 1991 that the band had dissolved.

Recording

Wanting to try something different after their use of regional American music and the pop song format on their previous two albums Little Creatures (1985) and True Stories (1986), Talking Heads decided to record their next album in Paris with a group of international musicians. According to the album's liner notes, the decision to do so was in part a reaction to the foreign policy of the Ronald Reagan administration, which had grown increasingly isolationist in approach. Prior to leaving for France, the band recorded about 40 improvisational tracks that would serve as the foundation for the sessions in Paris.

In Paris, the band, along with producer Steve Lillywhite, were joined by a number of other musicians in the recording studio where they would rehearse and play for the entire day. At the end of each day, one take was selected as being the ideal version of a particular tune. "Paris is a wonderful place to work," observed drummer Chris Frantz in the liner notes of Once in a Lifetime: The Best of Talking Heads. "We were really embracing world culture fully." In the interest of freedom for the musicians, it was decided that lyrics and melodies would be left until later. The lyrics were not overdubbed until the band returned to New York. Many of David Byrne's lyrics were improvisations sung along with the prerecorded tracks until he found something that he felt worked. In this way, the melodies and lyrics evolved in a similar fashion as the songs themselves. According to Lillywhite, the album's more organic, percussive sound was a deliberate move away from the bombastic production that he had helped make commonplace in the 1980s, stating that "It wasn't made so angular and mixed so loud as it might have been in the past. It was more of a warm sound with all for the beats compensated for."

Byrne told Record Mirror in 1988 that many of the songs on Naked are "about human beings stripped of their pretensions; stripped of their surface trappings", which in turn inspired putting a picture of a chimpanzee on the album cover.

Critical reception

Naked was well received by critics, who hailed it as a vast improvement over True Stories. Chris Willman from the Los Angeles Times said the band abandoned "the stripped-down four-piece rock approach of late" in favor of a "far more eclectic big-band, world music extravaganza." In Rolling Stone, Anthony DeCurtis called the album "stylistically bold and intellectually provocative," a "dizzying and disturbing piece of work" that "marks a return to the more open-ended, groove-oriented style the Heads defined on Remain in Light." He noted that "the vital human harmony suggested by the international band of players .. is the strongest counterpoint to the album's pervasive themes of alienation and dread." He concluded by interpreting the view of the album's lyrics: "The human race consists of some pretty cool people ... but it's got a very destructive monkey on its back. Human survival is not guaranteed. With humor and good-hearted-ness [sic], hope and fear, Talking Heads contemplate a world on the eve of destruction on this important record — and leave wide open the question of what the dawn will bring."

Naked was voted the 24th best album of 1988 in The Village Voices annual Pazz & Jop poll of American critics nationwide. Robert Christgau, the poll's supervisor, regarded it as "an honest if less than sustaining internationalist gesture" and said "Byrne concealed the ricketiness of his current compositional practice by riding in on soukous's jetstream, but the trick didn't stick", attributing the band's diminished success to a weariness with the music business. In Christgau's Record Guide: The '80s (1990), he wrote, "where Paul Simon appropriated African musicians, David Byrne just hires them, for better and worse – this is T. Heads funk heavy on the horns, which aren't fussy or obtrusive because Byrne knew where to get fresh ones. What's African about it from an American perspective is that the words don't matter – it signifies sonically." However, he called, "(Nothing But) Flowers" a "gibe at ecology fetishism that's very reassuring". Years later, he revised his stance on both Naked and True Stories, "which I once thought overrated. I was wrong. They sucked."

In a retrospective review, Michael Hastings from AllMusic found Naked "alternately serious and playful", allowing Byrne to continue worrying about "the government, the environment, and the plight of the working man as it frees up the rest of the band to trade instruments and work with guest musicians. It's closest in spirit to Remain in Light – arguably too close." He further stated that "the album sounds technically perfect, but there's little of the loose, live feel the band achieved with former mentor Brian Eno. It's quite a feat to pull off a late-career album as ambitious as Naked, and the Heads do so with style and vitality." He concluded that "the album's elegiac, airtight tone betrays the sound of four musicians growing tired of the limits they've imposed on one another." Stephen Thomas Erlewine said it "marked a return to their worldbeat explorations, although it sometimes suffered from Byrne's lyrical pretensions."

Track listing
All lyrics written by David Byrne, all music composed by Byrne, Chris Frantz, Jerry Harrison, and Tina Weymouth.

Cassette/CD versions

LP version

2005 DualDisc reissue bonus track 

Notes
 Track 8, "Mommy Daddy You and I", was listed as "Mommy Daddy" on the vinyl label
 Track 12 originally appeared on the soundtrack to the film Until the End of the World

Personnel

Talking Heads
 David Byrne – vocals, guitar, keyboards, toy piano, slide guitar
 Chris Frantz – drums, keyboard percussion
 Jerry Harrison – piano, keyboards, guitar, slide guitar, tambourine, backing vocals
 Tina Weymouth – bass, keyboards, organ, backing vocals

Recording
 Nick Delre – assistant overdubbing engineer; mixing on "Mommy Daddy You and I"
 James Farber – mixing on "The Facts of Life", "Totally Nude", "The Democratic Circus", "Big Daddy", "Mr. Jones"
 Fernando Kral – overdubbing engineer; mixing on "Cool Water"
 Richard Manwaring – recording engineer
 Jean Loup Morette – assistant engineer
 Joseph Williams – assistant engineer
 Jack Skinner – mastering
 Mark Wallis – mixing on "Blind", "The Democratic Circus", "Ruby Dear", "(Nothing But) Flowers"

Additional musicians

 Johnny Marr – guitars on "Ruby Dear", "(Nothing But) Flowers", "Mommy Daddy You and I" and "Cool Water"
 Brice Wassy – percussion on "Ruby Dear", "(Nothing But) Flowers", "The Facts of Life" and "Big Daddy"
 Abdou M'Boup – percussion, talking drum, congas, cowbell on "Blind", "Mr. Jones", "Totally Nude" and "(Nothing But) Flowers"
 Yves N'Djock – guitar on "Blind", "Totally Nude" and "(Nothing But) Flowers"
 Eric Weissberg – pedal steel guitar on "Totally Nude" and "Bill", dobro on "The Democratic Circus"
 Mory Kanté – kora on "Mr. Jones" and "The Facts of Life"
 Wally Badarou – keyboard on "Blind" and "The Facts of Life"
 Manolo Badrena – percussion, congas on "Mr. Jones" and "Mommy Daddy You and I"
Sydney Thiam – congas on "The Democratic Circus", percussion on "Bill"
 Lenny Pickett– saxophones on "Blind" and "Big Daddy"
 Steve Elson – saxophones on "Blind" and "Big Daddy"
 Robin Eubanks – trombone on "Blind", "Big Daddy" and "Mr. Jones"
 Laurie Frink and Earl Gardner – trumpets on "Blind" and "Big Daddy"
 Stan Harrison – alto saxophone on "Blind" and "Big Daddy"
 Al Acosta – tenor saxophone on "Mr. Jones"
 Steve Gluzband – trumpet on "Mr. Jones"
 Jose Jerez – trumpet on "Mr. Jones"
 Bobby Porcelli – alto saxophone on "Mr. Jones"
 Steve Sacks – baritone saxophone on "Mr. Jones"
 Charlie Sepulveda – trumpet on "Mr. Jones"
 Dale Turk – bass trombone on "Mr. Jones"
 Arthur Russell - cello on "Bill"
 Moussa Cissokao – percussion on "Ruby Dear"
 Nino Gioia – percussion on "The Facts of Life"
 Philippe Servain – accordion on "Totally Nude"
 James Fearnley – accordion on "Mommy Daddy You and I"
 Phil Bodner – cor anglais on "Cool Water"
 Don Brooks – harmonica on "Big Daddy"
 Kirsty MacColl – backing vocals on "(Nothing But) Flowers" and "Bill"
 Alex Haas – whistling on "Bill"

Charts

Weekly charts

Year-end charts

Certifications and sales

References

1988 albums
Albums produced by David Byrne
Albums produced by Chris Frantz
Albums produced by Jerry Harrison
Albums produced by Tina Weymouth
Albums produced by Steve Lillywhite
Sire Records albums
Talking Heads albums
Worldbeat albums
World music albums by American artists

cs:Naked